The Vantage Bridge is a bridge in the U.S. state of Washington. It carries Interstate 90 across the Columbia River, near Vantage and George, Washington. This section of the river is named Wanapum Lake; it is the reservoir formed by Wanapum Dam. The bridge separates the Ginkgo Petrified Forest and Wanapum Recreational Area State Park on the western bank of the Columbia.

The current bridge is the second Vantage Bridge. The first was built in 1927 as part of the Sunset Highway (later US 10), a precursor to I-90. In 1962 the second bridge was built because the reservoir pool backing up behind the new Wanapum Dam would soon overwhelm the old bridge; it was dedicated by the state on November 9, 1962. The first bridge was dismantled. In 1968 its steel cantilever truss was reused for the Lyons Ferry Bridge, where SR 261 crosses the Snake River.

References

External links 
Vantage Bridge traffic web cameras

Bridges over the Columbia River
Transportation buildings and structures in Kittitas County, Washington
Bridges in Grant County, Washington
Interstate 90
Bridges completed in 1927
Bridges completed in 1962
Road bridges in Washington (state)
Bridges on the Interstate Highway System
1962 establishments in Washington (state)
Through arch bridges in the United States